Chucrch of St Nonna may refer to:

 Church of St Nonna, Altarnun. Cornwall
Church of St Nonna, Bradstone, Devon
 Church of St Nonna, Caradon. Cornwall